Sar Choqa-ye Sofla may refer to:

Sar Choqa-ye Sofla, Isfahan